Ariyankuppam (West)  is a panchayat village in Ariyankuppam Commune in the Union Territory of Puducherry, India.

Geography
Ariyankuppam (West) is bordered by Ariyankuppam River in the north, Ariyankuppam in the east, Sankaraparani River in the south and Chinna Irusampalayam (Tamil Nadu) in the West. The portion of Ariyankuppam located west of NH-45A and Tollgate comes under Ariyankuppam (West) Village Panchayat.

Demographics
Ariyankuppam (West) has an average literacy rate of 81.49%, male literacy is 88.89%, and female literacy is 74.13%. In Ariyankuppam (West), 10% of the population is under 6 years of age.

Villages
Following are the villages under Ariyankuppam (West) Village Panchayat.
 Arunthathipuram
 Tollgate
 Nonankuppam

Tourism

Chunnambar Boat House

Chunnambar Boat House is located in Ariyankuppam. It is one of the major tourist spot in Puducherry and it can be reached at a distance of 7 km from Puducherry. The boat house needs to be renamed either Ariyankuppam Boat House or  Sankaraparani Boat House as it is located in Sankaraparani river  bank at Ariyankuppam. Chunnambar is a name given to Sankaraparani river. The boat house comes under Ariyankuppam (West) village of Ariyankuppam Commune.

PachaiVazhiAmman Kovil

Arulmigu PachaiVazhiAmman sametha Mannathaswamy Kovil is an ancient temple of Ariyankuppam dating to the 17th century. It is located between Ariyankuppam and Chunnambar Boat House at a distance of 1.2 km from Ariyankuppam. The presiding deity is Goddess Pachaivazhiamman

Politics
Ariyankuppam (West) up to Ariyankuppam Police Station is a part of Ariyankuppam (State Assembly Constituency), Whereas Nonakuppam and Tollgate comes under Manavely (State Assembly Constituency) which is under Puducherry (Lok Sabha constituency)

Gallery

References

External links
 Official website of the Government of the Union Territory of Puducherry

Villages in Puducherry district
Ariyankuppam